Payosphaeria is a genus of fungi in the Hypocreales order. The relationship of this taxon to other taxa within the order is unknown (incertae sedis), and it has not yet been placed with certainty into any family. This is a monotypic genus, containing the single species Payosphaeria minuta.

References

External links
Payosphaeria at Index Fungorum

Hypocreales incertae sedis
Monotypic Sordariomycetes genera